Seiter & Miller Advertising is an independently owned, full service advertising agency based in New York City.  Seiter & Miller was founded over 20 years ago by defectors from some of the largest advertising agencies in the country.  Seiter & Miller is a member of  AMIN Worldwide (Advertising and Marketing International Network), a global alliance of independently owned agencies growing through collaboration.


Clients
Seiter & Miller has done notable work for a range of clients including BDO International, Arnold Bread, Kyocera, NYU, Smith & Wollensky, AXA, PwC, Towers Perrin, Stroehmann Bakeries, American Express, and Jordan Opportunity Fund.  The Agency also worked on a pro bono campaign in collaboration with Stop TB Partnership to raise awareness of the global epidemic of TB.

Awards

UCEA 2010 Strategic Marketing Award – Best in Show (Silver)
UCEA 2010 Marketing and Publications Award – Print Publications: General (Silver)

References

External links
Seiter & Miller Official Website
AMIN Worldwide
Ads for N.Y.U. Have Their Words in the Clouds, New York Times Article
Seiter & Miller Returns Bakery to TV
Context Crisis: Why Agencies Need Media Directors Most by Bob Rose, Jan. 22, 2010
Surviving the Goliaths by Seiter & Miller President, Livingston Miller, Apr. 7, 2008
I've Got A Beef With Mass Marketing by Livingston Miller, Sept. 24, 2007

Companies based in New York City
Advertising agencies of the United States